Libraries Connect Ohio (LCO) is an internet resource provided by all libraries in the state of Ohio. LCO provides premium subscription databases for use of all Ohioans with a library card/school ID. Libraries Connect Ohio has various networks aimed at  different "demographics".
 Ohio Public Library Information Network (OPLIN) - for Public Libraries
 INFOhio - for K-12 students
 OhioLINK- for College Students

External links	
	

Libraries in Ohio
Communications in Ohio